Televisão (Television) is the second studio album by Brazilian rock band Titãs, released in 1985 via WEA. It is the first album to feature drummer Charles Gavin, following André Jung's departure in the previous year.

Televisão was conceived to mimic a television, in that each track represented a channel, i.e. tracks would navigate between musical genres just like different kinds of programs could be watched by switching channels. The cover picture wasn't edited so it would look like a TV screenshot; the band was effectively filmed by a camera and the images were broadcast to a television, and the photographer took a picture of its screen.

It was the band's first album produced by Lulu Santos, who was chosen in order to create a different sound from other Brazilian rock bands of that time.

In 1998, when asked about the destiny of the character Dona Nenê from the homonymous song, the band said "it's a mystery as of today" and that "no one knows where she is". During a performance of "Massacre" at Marília Gabriela's program, politician Jânio Quadros protested, saying "that wansn't music" and that it was "crap".

The album sold a total of 100,000 copies, but only 25,000 initially, which was considered a "relative failure" by the band. In a 2006 article, vocalist and keyboardist Sérgio Britto commented that tracks such as "Televisão", "Massacre", "Pavimentação" and "Autonomia" hinted the musical direction the band would take in their next album, Cabeça Dinossauro.

Track listing

Personnel
Arnaldo Antunes - vocals
Branco Mello - Vocals
Nando Reis - Bass, vocals
Charles Gavin - drums, Timpani
Sérgio Britto - Keyboards, vocals
Paulo Miklos - Vocals, keyboards in "Não Vou Me Adaptar", "Tudo Vai Passar" and "Insensível", bass in "Pra Dizer Adeus".
Marcelo Fromer - Rhythm & Lead Guitar
Tony Bellotto - Lead & Rhythm Guitar

Guest performances
Lulu Santos - Lead guitar in "Pra Dizer Adeus", bass in "Dona Nenê".
Leo Gandelman - Saxophone in "Televisão" and "Pavimentação".

Singles

"Televisão" 
"Televisão" was released as the second single by Titãs in 1985. It would be later used as the credit music for Beyond Citizen Kane. Its chorus refers to someone named Cride - such person did exist; he was Euclides Gomes dos Santos, a close old friend of comedian Ronald Golias. Even though the song was released in 1985, it wasn't until 2014 that he met the band personally, when they performed in his hometown São Carlos - he would die in the next year, at the age of 88.

The song is "a critical view of the screen present in our daily lives in a manner at times suffocating" and it debates the role of television in the one's dumbing down process, though allowing one to notice they're a victim of this process.

The song is the opening theme of Tá no Ar, of Rede Globo, since its debut season in 2014. From Season 4 on, in 2017, a cover by Lulu Santos was implemented.

"Insensível" 

"Insensível" was released as the third single by the band in 1985. An acoustic version of the song was later recorded and released on Volume Dois.

The music video of "Insensível" shows the band performing on top of a building, with TV monitors behind them. From the half of the video on, a woman (presumably a geisha, given her very white face, red lips and Japanese eyes) starts appearing in the monitors.

Track listing

References 

1985 albums
Titãs albums
Warner Music Group albums
Portuguese-language albums